Andy Fanton is a British comic strip creator, artist and writer who is best known for his work in The Dandy and The Beano.

Fanton's work first appeared in the first issue of the 2010 relaunched Dandy with his strip 'George Vs Dragon'. After the initial 12-week run finished, Fanton moved on to ghostly goings on in 'Boo!' from February 2011 to April 2011 plus a revamp of the 80's Dandy comic Harry And His Hippo which ran from March 2011 to April 2011, as part of "Strictly Come Laughing". Harry and His Hippo won the vote, ahead of Daredevil Dad, Tag Team Tastic and Phil's Finger. Andy Fanton later introduced more series such as Bad Grandad and Secret Agent Sir. Fanton's characters continue to appear in The Dandy Summer Specials and yearly Dandy Annual.

For the final print edition of The Dandy on its 75th anniversary, Andy Fanton drew Bad Grandad, Hungry Horace, Plum MacDuff and Harry and his Hippo. Andy Fanton is currently writing Minnie The Minx and The Bash Street Kids in The Beano.

Andy also publishes his own website fiction series; the Astonishing Adventures of Lord Likely, which has been running since 2007, along with his popular webcomic, The Carrotty Kid, which was commissioned into an animated pilot for ITV in 2004 by Cosgrove Hall Films.

However, the pilot of The Carrotty Kid was not transmitted due to ITV cutting back on new children's programming.

In 2018 Andy was asked to adapt and serialise Disney's pug-based live-action rom-com 'Patrick: Pug, Actually', which was later collected and released as a book.

Andrew lives in Portsmouth UK.

List of published comics
 George VS. Dragon ~ The Dandy
 Boo! ~ The Dandy
 Harry and his Hippo ~ The Dandy
 Grampire ~ The Dandy
 Springwatch ~ The Dandy
 Mad March Hare ~ The Dandy
 Thor ~ The Dandy
 Dave the Squirrel ~ The Dandy
 Punslinger ~ The Dandy (writing)
 Elf and Safety ~ The Dandy
 Rude-olph ~ The Dandy
 Stupid Barrio Bros ~ The Dandy
 Iykan Si-Yu ~ The Dandy
 Bad Grandad ~ The Dandy
 Al Kazam ~ The Dandy
 Cavemen in Black ~ The Dandy
 The Chav Olympics ~ The Dandy
 The Dirty Radish ~ The Dandy
 Rocky Roller, Pest Controller ~ The Dandy
 Teacher Training ~ The Dandy
 Constable Clod ~ The Dandy
 Secret Agent Sir ~ The Dandy
 Plum MacDuff ~ The Dandy
 Something Funny ~ The Dandy
 Hungry Horace ~ The Dandy
 Little Plum ~ The Beano (writing)
 Constable Caveman ~ The Beano
 Emlyn the Gremlin ~ The Beano
 Robopop ~ The Beano
 Bertrum Muffet and the Violent Egg ~ Self Published

References

External links 
 Andy Fanton Dot Com
 The Astonishing Adventures of Lord Likely
 The Carrotty Kid
 Robot Wars trivia
 Review of new Dandy by Forbidden Planet
 Digital Spy News Report
 The Dandy News by Forbidden Planet

British comics artists
British comics writers
Living people
The Dandy people
The Beano people
Year of birth missing (living people)